Borja Rozada (born 16 September 1981) is a Spanish rallying co-driver. He is partnered with Dani Sordo for Hyundai Motorsport in the World Rally Championship category.

Rally career
Rozada made his WRC debut at the 2007 Rally de Portugal. His best result alongside Mexican driver Benito Guerra was the 6th place in 2014 Rally Mexico. On 28 December 2020, three-time rally winner Dani Sordo announced Rozada as his new co-driver, replacing compatriot Carlos del Barrio.

Rally results

WRC results

References

External links

 Borja Rozada's e-wrc profile

1981 births
Living people
Spanish rally co-drivers
World Rally Championship co-drivers